John Gately Downey (June 24, 1827 – March 1, 1894) was an Irish-American politician and the seventh governor of California from January 14, 1860, to January 10, 1862. Until the taking of the office of Governor of California of Arnold Schwarzenegger in 2003, Downey was the only governor of California to be born outside the United States. Downey was also the first man from Southern California to serve as governor.

Early years
Downey was born on June 24, 1827, in the townland of Castlesampson, Taughmaconnell parish, County Roscommon, in central Ireland, to Denis Downey and Bridget Gately. Castlesampson is 12 kilometres west of the town of Athlone. He emigrated with his family at the age of 14 to the United States in 1842, before the famine years. Settling in Charles County, Maryland, the Downeys joined two stepsisters who had already settled in the U.S. Dwindling family finances forced Downey to halt his education at age 16 and start working to become independent. He apprenticed at an apothecary in Washington, D.C. until 1846.

Career
Downey relocated to Cincinnati, Ohio, where he worked as a druggist.  Like many who heard about the California Gold Rush, Downey decided to go West.  He stopped along the way at Vicksburg, Mississippi; then Havana, Cuba and finally New Orleans, Louisiana. By 1849, Downey had arrived in California, briefly prospecting in Grass Valley before finding a job at a drug store in San Francisco.

He soon moved to Los Angeles, and he was elected for a one-year term to the Los Angeles Common Council in May 1852 and again in May 1856. He resigned from the council in December 1856.

A Lecompton Democrat who favored slavery in the Kansas Territory, Downey was elected as a member of the lower house California State Assembly for the 1st District, serving from 1856 to 1857. In the 1859 general elections, Downey was elected Lieutenant Governor, overcoming the party split within the Democratic Party between Lecompton and Anti-Lecompton Democrats, as well as seeing off a challenge from the infant Republican Party.

Governorship
Five days after Downey was sworn in as lieutenant governor, Governor Milton Latham resigned after being elected (by the State Legislature) to fill the federal Senate vacancy left by the death of David C. Broderick, killed in a duel in 1859. Downey assumed the governorship on January 14, 1860.

During Downey's governorship, the Assembly and Senate passed the "Bulkhead Bill," a highly controversial bill heavily supported by San Francisco capitalists.  It would have placed the city's waterfront in the hands of private companies within monopolies.  Despite support for the bill among San Francisco's wealthy, local merchants and the public alike were in staunch opposition. In a move that stunned many former wealthy supporters, Downey vetoed the Bulkhead Bill.  He said,
 
[I]ts provisions are not only in conflict with the constitution and the principles of natural justice, but that the measure as a whole is calculated to work irreparable injury to our commerce, internal and external, of which San Francisco is and must forever remain a metropolis.

Downey's veto was widely popular both in San Francisco and throughout California, and it marked the peak of his popularity.  Visiting the city shortly afterward, Downey was greeted as a hero.  But, supporters of the Bulkhead Bill never forgave the governor. During a later visit to San Francisco, Downey described a protester as a "bulkheader."  The man responded with a fist fight, broken up only when Downey supporters physically restrained his opponent.

At the 1860 presidential election, the Democratic Party again splintered. Anti-Lecomptons favored Stephen A. Douglas, while Lecomptons supported John C. Breckinridge.  Previously part of the Lecompton faction, Downey sided with Anti-Lecomptons, supporting Douglas in his failed bid against Abraham Lincoln.

American Civil War
By the outbreak of the American Civil War, Downey pledged support to the Union, responding to requests by U.S. Secretary of War Simon Cameron for California troop assistance.  But Downey's support for the Unionist cause remained vague.  According to Victorian historian Theodore H. Hittell,

Downey's unionism, it was very plain, was not of the kind by which the Union could be preserved. It meant continued submission and subserviency to slavery and the slave power, which had hitherto dominated the country while the advance of the age had outgrown it ... It cannot be said that Downey had any special love for slavery or the slave power; on the contrary, he had to a very considerable extent broken loose of the chivalry and what was called an Anti-Lecompton Democrat; but unfortunately for himself, he was still hampered with old-time doctrines when slavery ruled unquestioned ...

With the Civil War in its first stages by the 1861 general elections, Downey's earlier support generated by his veto of the Bulkhead Bill had all but evaporated.  Downey's Democratic Party again splintered violently over slavery and the Union.  Despite turning away from the Lecompton "Breckinridge" faction, Downey failed to gain the nomination of the Anti-Lecompton "Unionist" Democrats during the state Democratic convention.  This effectively ended his political career.  During the election, the Republican Party capitalized on the Democratic split and won the elections.  Californians voted for Leland Stanford over Breckinridge Democrat John R. McConnell and Unionist Democrat John Conness.

Post governorship
After his term as governor expired in 1862, Downey returned to Southern California.  In 1871, he helped co-found Farmers and Merchants Bank, the first successful bank in Los Angeles, with Isaias W. Hellman, a banker, philanthropist and future president of Wells Fargo.

In 1879, Downey joined some public-spirited citizens led by Judge Robert Maclay Widney, in laying the groundwork for the University of Southern California, the first university in the region. When Widney formed a board of trustees, he secured a donation of 308 lots of land from three prominent members of the community: Ozro W. Childs, a Protestant horticulturist; Hellman, a German-Jew; and Downey.  The gift provided land for a campus as well as a source of endowment, the seeds of financial support for the nascent institution. Downey Street on the USC campus is named after him.

Later years

In 1883, Downey, along with his wife, Maria Jesus Guirado, the daughter of a prominent Mexican gentleman of Sonora, were involved in a train accident at Tehachapi Pass, when their train plunged into a ravine.  A porter pulled Governor Downey out of the burning wreckage, but Mrs. Downey's body was never found.  The event plagued Downey for the remainder of his life, as he suffered from what was described as "nervous shock."  Today it would likely be called Post-traumatic stress disorder.

Following the accident and the death of Downey's wife, his friend Frank M. Pixley introduced him to the twenty-year-old Yda Hillis Addis, a new writer at Pixley's San Francisco journal The Argonaut.  Downey was 32 years older than Addis, and they became engaged to marry. When Downey's two sisters discovered the betrothal, they were not pleased.  Downey was a wealthy man; if he should pass away, his wealth would shift to Addis. The sisters took Downey and put him on a boat to Ireland.  Addis sued for breach of promise, but left San Francisco before the trial.  Some time after returning to the U.S., Downey  married Rosa V. Kelly, of Los Angeles.

In 1880, Downey had acquired the nearly  Warner's Ranch in San Diego County, which was being used for cattle ranching. In 1892 he moved to evict Cupeño American Indians who occupied some of the land as their traditional historic territory, especially near the hot springs (Agua Caliente.) The Cupeño challenged the eviction in a case that reached the US Supreme Court, but by the time it was decided in 1901, Downey had died. While the court ruled the Cupeño did have a right to land, it said they had waited too long to press their case, according to a law about the issue when California entered the Union.

Downey died in 1894 at his home in Los Angeles.  He was originally interred at Old Calvary Cemetery in Los Angeles. After the cemetery was removed, Downey's remains were relocated to Holy Cross Cemetery in Colma.

Legacy
Downey, California was named after Downey. His land company owned the land that was subdivided to create the town in the 1870s.

During Downey's governorship, construction began on the California State Capitol in Sacramento. Also, during his governorship, the Pony Express began service to San Francisco, and the Central Pacific Railroad was formed.

See also
List of U.S. state governors born outside the United States

References

External links

 John G. Downey biography at the California State Library

Democratic Party governors of California
Lieutenant Governors of California
Politicians from Los Angeles
Businesspeople from Los Angeles
Land owners from California
American pharmacists
1827 births
1894 deaths
Los Angeles County Board of Supervisors
Los Angeles Common Council (1850–1889) members
Democratic Party members of the California State Assembly
American financial company founders
Farmers and Merchants Bank of Los Angeles people
University of Southern California people
Burials at Holy Cross Cemetery (Colma, California)
Downey, California
History of Los Angeles
Irish emigrants to the United States (before 1923)
People from County Roscommon
Union (American Civil War) state governors
19th-century American businesspeople
19th-century American politicians
19th century in Los Angeles